Present Indicative is a 1972 Hungarian drama film directed by Péter Bacsó. The film was selected as the Hungarian entry for the Best Foreign Language Film at the 45th Academy Awards, but was not accepted as a nominee.

Cast
 József Borsóhalmi as Somogyi bácsi
 Irén Bódis as Mózesné, Irén
 Ágnes Dávid as Zsófika
 Gabriella Koszta as Ica
 András Kovács as Kalocsa
 Tibor Liska as Kulcsár
 Lehel Ohidy as Takács, párttitkár (as Óhidy Lehel)
 Klára Pápai as Mózes anyja
 Ádám Rajhona as Kárász
 Ágoston Simon as Mózes Imre (as Simon Ágoston)
 László Sugár as Nagy
 Ferenc Szabó as Gyula bácsi
 Lajos Szabó as Görbe

See also
 List of submissions to the 45th Academy Awards for Best Foreign Language Film
 List of Hungarian submissions for the Academy Award for Best Foreign Language Film

References

External links
 

1972 films
1970s Hungarian-language films
1972 drama films
Films directed by Péter Bacsó
Hungarian black-and-white films
Hungarian drama films